Mam is a Mayan language spoken by about half a million Mam people in the Guatemalan departments of Quetzaltenango, Huehuetenango, San Marcos, and Retalhuleu, and the Mexican states of Campeche and Chiapas. Thousands more make up a Mam diaspora throughout the United States and Mexico, with notable populations living in Oakland, California and Washington, D.C.. The most extensive Mam grammar is Nora C. England's A grammar of Mam, a Mayan language (1983), which is based on the San Ildefonso Ixtahuacán dialect of Huehuetenango Department.

Classification

Mam is closely related to the Tektitek language, and the two languages together form the Mamean sub-branch of the Mayan language family. Along with the Ixilan languages, Awakatek and Ixil, these make up the Greater Mamean sub-branch, one of the two branches of the Eastern Mayan languages (the other being the Greater Quichean sub-branch, which consists of 10 Mayan languages, including Kʼicheʼ).

Dialects
Because contact between members of different Mam communities is somewhat limited, the language varies considerably even from village to village. Nevertheless, mutual intelligibility, though difficult, is possible through practice.

Mam varieties within Mexico and Guatemala are divided into five dialect groups:

Northern Mam in Campeche, Mexico and southern Huehuetenango Department, Guatemala. Northern Mam is the least conservative group according to Terrence Kaufman.
Southern Mam in southern Campeche, Mexico and Quetzaltenango Department, San Marcos Department, and Retalhuleu Department, Guatemala.
Central Mam in Chiapas, Mexico and San Marcos Department, Guatemala.
Western Mam in eastern Chiapas, Mexico and northwestern San Marcos Department, Guatemala. The Tektitek language may be mutually intelligible with Western Mam dialects.
Soconusco Mam in the Soconusco region, Chiapas, Mexico

In addition to these, the dialects of Chiapas, Mexico are characterised by significant grammatical as well as lexical differences from the Guatemalan varieties.

Distribution
Mam is spoken in 64 communities in four Guatemalan departments and numerous communities in Campeche and Chiapas, Mexico. Neighboring languages include Jakaltek and Qʼanjobʼal to the north, Tektitek and Qato'k to the west, and Ixil, Awakatek, Sipacapense, and Kʼicheʼ to the east.

Quetzaltenango Department
San Miguel Sigüilá
Concepción Chiquirichapa
Génova
El Palmar
San Juan Ostuncalco
Cajolá
San Martín Sacatepéquez
Colomba
Flores Costa Cuca
Huitán
Palestina de Los Altos
Cabricán

Huehuetenango Department
San Ildefonso
Ixtahuacán
Cuilco
Tectitán
San Pedro Necta
San Sebastián Huehuetenango
Malacatancito
Todos Santos Cuchumatán
San Rafael Petzal
Colotenango
Santa Bárbara
San Juan Atitán
Aguacatán
San Gaspar Ixchil
La Libertad
La Democracia
Huehuetenango
Chiantla
Santiago Chimaltenango
San Juan Ixcoy

San Marcos Department
San Antonio Sacatepéquez
San Lorenzo
Tejutla
San Rafael Pie de La Cuesta
San Pedro Sacatepéquez
La Reforma
El Quetzal
Sibinal
San José Ojetenam
Pajapita
San Cristobal Cucho
Nuevo Progreso
San Marcos
Concepción Tutuapa
San Pablo
Ixchiguan
San Miguel Ixtahuacán
Tacaná
Tajumulco
Catarina
Esquipulas Palo Gordo
Malacatán
Río Blanco
Comitancillo

Retalhuleu Department
El Xaw
Santa Ines
Sibaná
San Miguelito
Nueva Cajolá
San Roque

Chiapas
Motozintla
Tapachula
Acaxman
Bejucal de Ocampo
Frontera Comalapa
Mazapa de Madero
Escuintla
Chicomuselo
Siltepec
La Grandeza
Unión Juárez
Bella Vista
El Porvenir
Cacahoatán
Tuzantán
Tuxtla Chico
Huixtla
Huehuetán
Amatenango de la Frontera
Tuxchamén

Campeche
Champotón
Campeche
Santo Domingo Kesté
Quetzal-Edzná
Mayatecúm
Gumarcaaj

Phonology

Stress
Mam has weight sensitive stress assignment. Primary stress falls on the long vowel in a word if there is one, e.g.  'work'. Words without a long vowel assign primary stress to the vowel preceding the last glottal stop, e.g.  'dipper'. Words without a long vowel or a glottal stop assign stress to the vowel preceding the last consonant in the root, e.g.  'raccoon'. Stress is not assigned to suffixes or enclitics that do not have long vowels or a glottal stop.

Vowels
Mam has 10 vowels, 5 short and 5 long:

The Mid-central vowel is an allophone of short a, e and u that can occur in the syllable following a stressed long vowel.

Like in many other Mayan languages, vowel length is contrastive, and short and long vowels have different phonemic values and are treated as separate vowels. The long versions of the back vowels, /o/, /u/, /ɑ/ vowels, transcribed as [oo], [uu], and [aa] are slightly compressed and pronounced as /o͍ː/, /u͍ː/, and /ɑ͍ː/  respectively, being partially rounded.

In the Todos Santos dialect the vowel structure is somewhat different. While /o/, /a/, and /u/ remain the same as in other varieties, short /e/ has become the diphthong /ɛi/, an audio example of this can be heard here:

In the Todos Santos dialect, the long vowels (distinguished by the doubling of the letter) have evolved into separate sounds altogether.

In some dialects vowels interrupted by a stop have evolved into individual phonemes themselves, for example in Todos Santos dialect
/oʔ/ (spelled oʼ) has evolved into /ɵʏˀ/ and /oʔo/ (spelled oʼo) has evolved into /ɵʼʉ/.

Consonants
Mam has 27 consonants, including the glottal stop:

 Todos Santos Mam has an extended amount of affricate consonants being apical palato-alveolar .

/ɓ/ is realized as  word-finally and when part of a consonant cluster in many dialects.
 Examples:  [tsɛβʼ] goat,  [kβʼɤŋ] small table.

/p/ is realized as [pʰ] word-finally and word initially,  elsewhere,  in a consonant cluster and before short i, o, and u. It is pronounced as [ɸʰ] word finally in certain dialects. [f] is an interchangeable pronunciation of [ɸ].
 Examples:  [pʰiːt͡ʃ] bird,  [ʈ͡ʂkʰɯpʰ] or [ʈ͡ʂkʰɯɸʰ] animal,  [pʰt͡sʼaŋ] or [ɸʰt͡sʼaŋ] sugarcane.

/ch/ has evolved from /tʃ/ to /sʃ/ in most Mexican dialects and some northern Guatemalan dialects. Sometimes the /t/ sound is still lightly pronounced before the stressed /sʃ/ sound.
 Example:  [tʃʰoːtʰ] weeds has evolved into [sʃøːtʰ] or [tsʃoːtʰ]

/t/ is realized as [tʰ] word-finally and before another consonant, [t] elsewhere.
 Examples:  [taʔl̥] juice, soup,  [t͡ʃʼɪtʰ] bird,  [ʛoːtʰχ] dough

/k/ is realized as [kʰ] word-finally and before another consonant, [k] elsewhere.
 Examples:  [pɑːkɪʔl̥] butterfly,  [ʂtʰoːkʰ] staff,  [kʰχɤʔŋ] cornfield

In the Todos Santos dialect, /w/ is realized as either  or  word-initially or between vowels and before another consonant, as  following a consonant and as  word finally.
 Examples:  [ʋɑːχ], [vɑːχ], [v̥ɑːχ], or [βɑːχ] tortilla,  [twɤŋ], [tʍɤŋ], [tʋɤŋ] introversion,  [lɛʋ], [lɛv] [lɛv̥ʰ] [lɛfʰ] care.

/q/ is realized as  word-finally and before another consonant,  elsewhere.
 Examples: ' [muːqɪŋ] tortilla,  [ɑːqʰ] honeycomb,  [qʰɺoːlχ] obscurity

 Examples:  [tʼɾɪkʰɸuːl̥] ~ [ɗɾɪkʰpuːl̥] to jump,  [t͡ʃʼuːtʼ] ~ [t͡ʃʼuːɗ] something sharp-pointed
 Examples:  [tʼɯtʼaŋ] ~ [ɗɯɗaŋ] wet,  [vɪtʼli] ~ [vɪɗli] seated squatting

/n/ is realized as  before velar- and uvular consonants and word-finally, as  before  and as  before /ɓ/ and /p/,  elsewhere.
 Examples:  [nɪm] much,  [χuːŋ] one,  [ʛaŋkʲɤqʰ] thunder
 Examples:  [sɑːŋχel̥] sent,  [ɲɯʃ] my godfather
 Examples:  [qamɓaʂ] foot,  [mpwɑːqɛ] my money

/l/ is realized as  word-finally,  before short vowels and after plosives, bilabial, alveolar and retroflex consonants and [l] elsewhere. 
 Examples:  [luːʂ] cricket,  [ɺoʔl̥] to eat fruits,  [vɺatʰ] stiff.

 Examples:  [kɕʲχaʲʔtsʰaŋ],  [kʲɤkleːŋ]

/ ʼ / is realized as [ʲʔ] following /a/, /aa/, /e/, /ee/, /i/, /u/, /uu/ and /oo/. The standard pronunciation is simply  after all vowels however in spoken speech [ʲʔ] is the common pronunciation. A similar trend can be seen in other Eastern Mayan languages. After /o/ it is pronounced as [ʉʔ] and after /ii/ it is pronounced simply as [ʔ]. Following consonants / ʼ / modifies each individual consonant differently as explained in the section above. In the Mam language every word must start with a consonant. In the current orthography initial / ʼ / is not written but if a word ever begins with a vowel, the word is treated as if it begin with a / ʼ /. The initial / ʼ / may be pronounced as either [ʔ] or [ʡ] in free variation.

Syllable structure
Most roots take the morphological shape CVC.The only possible root final consonant cluster is -nC. Syllables can have up to four consonants in a cluster in any position. Most consonant clusters are the result of vowel dropping and morpheme addition.

Morphology
Mam has two sets of agreement markers, known to Mayanists as Set A and Set B markers, which can appear on both nouns and verbs. Mam uses Set A (ergative) markers on nouns to mark possessor agreement and on verbs to cross-reference the transitive subject. Mam uses Set B (absolutive) markers on transitive verbs to cross-reference the object and on intransitive verbs to cross-reference the subject. Below is a table of Set A (ergative) and Set B (absolutive) prefixes from England. 

Phonologically conditioned allomorphs are as follows.
n- ~ w-
n- /__C
w- /__V
Ø ~ tz- ~ tzʼ- ~ k-
k- /potential
tzʼ- /__V initial root, non-potential
tz- /__uul 'arrive here', iky''' 'pass by', non-potential
Ø- /__C, non-potential
-a ~ -ya
-ya /V__ ; In the first person in post-vowel environments, -ya varies freely with -kyʼa and -y.
-a /C__

Some paradigmatic examples from England (1983) are given below. Note that "Ø-" designates a null prefix. Additionally, ma is an aspectual word meaning 'recent past'.

The Mam verb complex
Verbs in Mam can include inflection for person, aspect and mode, as well as auxiliaries in the form of directionals. The verb complex has distinct forms for transitive and intransitive verb stems depending in part on whether the complex cross-references one or two arguments. The lexical status of the verb complex is ambiguous. The inflections with vowels are phonologically independent (indicated by spaces). Transitive verb complexes with directionals have a dependent suffix. Two of England's examples of intransitive and transitive verb complexes are shown below.

Intransitive verb complex with directional (England 1983:162)

Transitive verb complex with directional (England 1983:175)

Mam extends the Set A (ergative) person markers in the context of focused adverbials and certain subordinate clauses. In these contexts, the Set A markers cross-reference the subject of intransitive verbs and both the subject and object of transitive verbs. The following examples show the extended ergative marker /t-/ in bold.

Intransitive verb complex with extended ergative marking (England 1983:259)

Transitive verb complex with extended ergative marking (England 1983:259)

REC:recent past
POT:potential aspect
ABS:absolutive agreement (Set B)
ERG:ergative agreement (Set A)
DEP:dependent suffix
DIR:directional
ENC:person enclitic
REL:relational noun
PAT:patient

Verb morphemes

Transitive verbal affixes
-bʼaa 'transitivizer' (vowel length can also be used)
-laa 'applicative'
-wa 'applicative'
-bʼV 'causative'
-chV 'causative' (variants: -chaa, -chii, -chuu)
-kʼuu 'causative'
-lV 'causative'
-mV 'causative'
-nV 'causative'
-pV 'causative'
-qʼV 'causative'
-saa 'causative'
-tzii 'causative'
-tzʼV 'causative'
-txʼii 'causative'
-wV 'causative'
-najee' 'repetitive'
-'kJ 'processive'
-'tz 'processive imperative'

Intransitive verbal affixes
-n 'antipassive'
-Vn 'affect'
-ax 'versive'
-ee' 'versive'
-eet 'passive'
-j 'passive'
-njtz 'passive'
-bʼaj 'processive passive'
-bʼa 'intransitivizer'
-ch 'intransitivizer'
-chaj 'intransitivizer'
-paj 'intransitivizer'
-t 'intransitivizer'
-tzʼaj 'intransitivizer'
-tzʼaq 'intransitivizer'
-' ... -al 'specific termination'

Other verbal affixes
-l 'infinitive'

Aspects
Mam verbs have 6 aspects that are prefixed to the verb root.
ma 'recent past'
o 'past'
ok 'potential' (not obligatory)
n- 'progressive'
x- 'recent past dependent' (used in subordinate clauses)
Ø- 'past dependent' (used in subordinate clauses)

Modes
Potential transitive: -a'
Potential intransitive: -l
Imperative: -m (-n before directionals)

Directionals
Directionals are auxiliary elements in verb phrases. They are derived from intransitive verbs.

xi 'away from'
tzaj 'toward'
ul 'there to here'
pon 'here to there'
kubʼ 'down'
jaw 'up'
el 'out'
ok 'in'
kyaj 'remaining'
aj 'returning from here'
ikyʼ 'passing'
bʼaj 'complete'

Pronouns
Mam has no independent pronouns. Rather, pronouns in Mam always exist as bound morphemes.

Nouns
The Mam language displays inalienable possession. Certain Mam nouns cannot be possessed, such as kya'j 'sky' and che'w 'star'. On the other hand, some Mam nouns are always possessed, such as t-lokʼ 'its root' and t-bʼaqʼ 'its seed'.

Noun phrase structure can be summarized into the following template.

{| class="wikitable" frame=void style="vertical-align:top; text-align:center; white-space:nowrap;"
|-
| Demonstrative
| Number
| Measure
| Plural
| Possessive affixes
| NOUN ROOT
| Possessor
| Adjective
| Relative clause
|}

The plural clitic is qa.

Noun affixes
aj- 'agent'
aj- 'native'
-l 'agentive'
-eenj 'patient'
-bʼil 'instrumental'
-bʼeen 'resultant locative'
-bʼan 'reminder'
-al 'abstract noun'
-abʼiil 'abstract noun'
-leen 'abstract noun'
-le'n 'abstract noun'
-an 'ordinal'
-bʼji'bʼil 'nominalizer'
-bʼal 'nominalizer'
-bʼatz 'nominalizer'
-l 'nominalizer'
-tl 'nominalizer'
-tz 'nominalizer'

Relational noun affixes
-u'n 'agent, instrument, causative'
-ee 'dative, possessive, patient, benefactive'
-i'j 'patient, thematic'
-uukʼal 'instrument, comitative'
-iibʼaj 'reflexive'

Locative affixes
-bʼutxʼ 'at the corner'
-i'jla 'around'
-iibʼaj 'over'
-jaqʼ 'under'
-txa'n 'at the edge of'
-txlaj 'beside'
-tzii' 'at the entrance of'
-uj 'in'
-witz 'on top of'
-wi' 'on, at the tip of'

Classifiers
jal 'non-human'
nu'xh 'baby'
xhlaaqʼ 'child'
bʼixh 'person of the same status (intimate)'
qʼa 'young man'
txin 'young woman'
ma 'man'
xu'j 'woman'
swe'j 'old man'
xhyaa' 'old woman'
xnuq 'old man (respectful)'
xuj 'old man (respectful)'

Measure words
Measure words quantify mass nouns.

baas 'glassful' (< Spanish vaso)
ma'l 'shot of liquor'
laq 'plateful'
pixh 'piece'
txut 'drop'
ba'uj 'a lot'

Numerals
San Ildefonso Ixtahuacán Mam numbers are as follows. Numbers above twenty are rarely used in Ixtahuacán and are usually only known by elderly speakers. Although the number system would have originally been vigesimal (i.e., base 20), the present-day number system of Ixtahuacán is now decimal.

1. juun 
2. kabʼ 
3. oox 
4. kyaaj 
5. jwe' 
6. qaq 
7. wuuq 
8. wajxaq 
9. bʼelaj 
10. laaj 
20. wiinqan 
40. kya'wnaq 
60. oxkʼaal 
80.. junmutxʼ

Syntax
Mam has both verbal and non-verbal types of sentences. Verbal sentences have verbal predicates, whereas non-verbal sentences have a stative or a locative/existential predicate. Verbal predicates have an aspect marker, while non-verbal predicates do not have aspect marking. Both verbal and non-verbal predicates occur in sentence-initial position unless a focused or topicalized phrase is present.
Verbal predicates
Verbal predicates are either transitive or intransitive according to the number of arguments cross-referenced in the verb complex. The number of arguments cross-referenced by the verb complex is not consistent with the transitivity of the verb root or the number of participants in an event. England notes examples of transitive verb roots that only appear in their antipassive or passive forms where they only cross-reference a single participant.

Transitive verb root with obligatory antipassive voice (England 1983:178)

Transitive verb root with obligatory passive voice (England 1983:180)

Another possibility is the use of intransitive motion verbs to express transitive events.

Intransitive motion verbs expressing transitive events (England 1983:181)

The basic word order in verbal sentences with two nominal arguments is VSO. Other word orders are not acceptable.

If only one argument appears in a transitive sentence and the argument is compatible with either person marker on the verb, it has a patient interpretation.

Mam speakers use a higher proportion of intransitive sentences than speakers of other Mayan languages. England and Martin (2003) found a low frequency of transitive sentences in Mam texts. Pye (2017:114-115) found a low use of overt subjects in transitive sentences in adults speaking to children. One adult produced overt subjects in 6% of transitive sentences. The same adult produced overt subjects in 41% of intransitive sentences and produced overt objects in 49% of transitive sentences.

Non-verbal predicates
Mam adds Set B person markers to nouns and adjectives to form non-verbal predicates. The following Set B person markers are used for non-verbal predicates (i.e., nouns, adjectives). Also, in statives, aa can be omitted when the rest of the stative is a non-enclitic (in other words, a separate, independent word).

Paradigmatic examples of non-verbal predicates from England (1983:76) are given below.

REC:recent past
AP:antipassive suffix
PAS:passive suffix
POT:potential aspect
ABS:absolutive agreement (Set B)
ERG:ergative agreement (Set A)
DEP:dependent suffix
DIR:directional
ENC:person enclitic
INTENS:intensive
REL:relational noun
PAT:patient
TV:transitive verb
IMP:imperative
CL:noun classifier

Child Language
An overview of child language acquisition in Mam can be found in Pye (2017). Child language data for Mam challenge many theories of language acquisition and demonstrate the need for more extensive documentation of native American languages.

Children acquiring Mam produce a higher proportion of verbs than children acquiring K’iche’, but a lower proportion of verbs compared to children acquiring Wastek and Chol. They produce a higher proportion of intransitive verbs relative to transitive verbs than children acquiring other Mayan languages (Pye, Pfeiler and Mateo Pedro 2017:22). Their high proportion of relational noun production is tied to their frequent use of intransitive verbs. 

The following examples illustrate the children’s use of intransitive verbs to express events with two participants. Ages are shown as (years;months.days). WEN (2;0.2) used the intransitive verb   ("go_down") in reference to an event of picking coffee. She used the relational noun phrase  to express the agent in an oblique phrase. CRU (2;5.12) used the intransitive verb   ("go_out") in reference to an event of taking out an object. She used the relational noun phrase  to express the agent. JOS (2;6.17) used the intransitive verb  ("finish") in reference to finishing a drink. He used the possessive prefix on the noun  ("drink")to express the agent. The examples overturn the hypothesis that children tie their use of transitive verbs to object manipulation events.

WEN (2;0.2) 
       

CRU (2;5.12) 
       

JOS (2;6.17) 
       

Two-year-old Mam children produce the consonants /m, n, p, t, ch, k, ʔ, l, y and w/. They produce /ʔ/ in place of glottalized stops, /p/ in place of /ɓ/, /k/ in place of /ky/ and /q/, /ch/ in place of /tz/ and /tx/, /xh/ in place of /x/, and /l/ in place of /r/. Mam children begin producing ejective consonants after they are three and a half years old. The early production of /ch/ and /l/ in Mam, as well as the late production of /s/, overturns predictions that all children have similar phonologies due to articulatory development.

The acquisition of morphology in Mam is heavily influenced by prosody. Two-year-old children favor the production of word syllables with primary stress, and most often produce syllables with the form CVC. Children do not consistently produce inflectional prefixes on nouns and verbs before they are four years old, although two-year-olds frequently produce verb suffixes, including the directional suffixes. Their production of the directional suffixes is evidence that two-year-old Mam children understand the complex grammatical constraints on the use of directionals. They distinguish between the use of the directional clitics and directional suffixes in indicative and imperative verbs. Two-year-old Mam speakers omit the person enclitic on nouns and verbs despite its high frequency of use in adult speech.

The following examples illustrate WEN’s verb complex production. In (1), WEN produced the vowel /a/ from the verb root  ("give"), the imperative suffix -n, and the directional suffix -tz as /xh/. (Many directionals have contracted forms as suffixes.). WEN omitted the person enclitic -a. In (2), WEN produced the progressive prefix n-, the vowel /e/ from the verb root  ("go out"), a spurious /n/, and the directional suffix -tz as /ch/. The intransitive verb  belongs to the class of motion verbs that take directional suffixes. Intransitive verbs outside of the class of motion verbs do not take directional suffixes except in imperative contexts. The verb  contracts with the directional suffix -tz to produce the stem  ("go out to") in adult speech. WEN’s omission of the person enclitic and production of a spurious consonant overturn the hypothesis that children produce forms that are frequent in adult speech.

WEN (1;9.2) 
       

WEN (1;8.21) 
       

The children’s production of the directional suffixes demonstrates their early recognition of the distinction between intransitive and transitive verbs in Mam. This distinction is a core feature of Mam grammar, and underpins the ergative morphology on the verbs and nouns. The semantic diversity of the verbs and positionals overturns the hypothesis that children use prototypical activity scenes as a basis for constructing grammatical categories. The children’s grammatical acumen is best seen in their use of the ergative and absolutive agreement markers on verbs. The children produced the prevocalic allomorphs of the ergative markers in nearly all of their obligatory contexts. They produced the preconsonantal allomorphs of the ergative markers in 20% of their obligatory contexts.

Two-year-old Mam children display a remarkable awareness of the contexts for extending the use of ergative markers to cross-reference the subject of intransitive verbs. Outside of these contexts, they consistently produced absolutive person markers on intransitive verbs. Three Mam children produced ergative person markers on intransitive verbs in half of the obligatory contexts for extended ergativity (Pye, Pfeiler & Mateo Pedro 2013:323). The children’s awareness of the contexts for extended ergative use is all the more remarkable because the contexts are tied to clauses in dependent contexts in which aspect is not overtly marked. The following example shows JOS’s use of extended ergative marking (in bold) on the intransitive verb  ("go_in") in a purpose clause headed by the adverb  ("so that"). The children’s production of ergative markers on intransitive verbs in dependent contexts overturns the theory that children link ergative markers to the subjects of transitive verbs in all contexts.

JOS (2;6.14) 
       

Mam two-year-olds produce sentences with a predicate-initial word order. The children, like adults, rarely produce the subject argument in transitive sentences. The Mam children show an ergative pattern of argument production that similar to the adult pattern. The children produced subject arguments in 7 percent or fewer of sentences with transitive verbs. The children produced subject arguments in 40 percent of sentences with intransitive verbs, and produced object arguments in 45 percent of sentences with transitive verbs. 

The acquisition data for Mam and other Mayan languages have profound implications for language acquisition theory. Children demonstrate an early proficiency with verb inflection in languages with a rich morphology and where the language’s prosodic structure highlights the morphology. The Mam children’s use of directionals and extended ergative marking shows that two-year-olds are capable of using complex affixes appropriately in their obligatory contexts. This morphology accounts for the language-specific look of the children’s early utterances and guides its development in later stages.
REC:recent past
AP:antipassive suffix
PAS:passive suffix
POT:potential aspect
ABS:absolutive agreement (Set B)
ERG:ergative agreement (Set A)
DEP:dependent suffix
DIR:directional
ENC:person enclitic
INTENS:intensive
REL:relational noun
PAT:patient
TV:transitive verb
IMP:imperative
CL:noun classifier

Further reading
Bʼaayil, Eduardo Pérez, et al. Variación dialectal en mam = Txʼixpubʼente tiibʼ qyool / Proyecto de Investigación Lingüística de Oxlajuuj Keej Mayaʼ Ajtzʼiibʼ. Guatemala, Guatemala: Cholsamaj, 2000.
England, Nora C. A grammar of Mam, a Mayan language. Austin: University of Texas Press, 1983.Pujbʼil yol mam / Kʼulbʼil Yol Twitz Paxil; Kʼulbʼil Yol Mam = Vocabulario mam / Academia de Lenguas Mayas de Guatemala; Comunidad Lingüística Mam. Guatemala, Guatemala: Kʼulbʼil Yol Twitz Paxil, 2003.
Rojas Ramírez, Maximiliano. Gramática del idioma Mam. La Antigua Guatemala, Guatemala: Proyecto Lingüístico Francisco Marroquín, 1993.

References

Notes

Bibliography
 

 

 England, Nora C. and Martin, Laura. (2003). Issues in the comparative argument structure analysis in Mayan narratives. In J. W. Du Bois, L. E. Kumpf and W. J. Ashby (Eds.), Preferred Argument Structures, pp. 130-155. John Benjamins.

 

Pye, Clifton, Pfeiler, Barbara and Mateo Pedro, Pedro. (2013). The acquisition of extended ergativity in Mam, Q’anjob’al and Yucatec. In Edith L. Bavin and Sabine Still (Eds.), The Acquisition of Ergativity, pp. 307-335. John Benjamins.

Pye, Clifton, Mateo, Pedro, Pfeiler, Barbara and Stengel, Donald. (2017). Analysis of variation in Mayan child phonologies. Lingua 198:38-52. http://dx.doi.org/10.1016/j.lingua.2017.07.001
Pye, Clifton and Pfeiler, Barbara. (2019). The acquisition of directionals in two Mayan languages. Front. Psychol.'' 10:2442.

External links

 A simple Mam – Spanish dictionary
 Robert Sitler's Mam – English dictionary (DOC) (PDF)
 Key phrases in Mam vs Spanish
 Books from Cholsamaj
 Mayan Languages Collection of Nora England at the Archive of the Indigenous Languages of Latin America, containing recordings and transcriptions of narratives and conversations in Mam.

Agglutinative languages
Mayan languages
Mam Maya
Mesoamerican languages
Indigenous languages of Central America
Languages of Guatemala
Huehuetenango Department
Quetzaltenango Department
San Marcos Department
Verb–subject–object languages
Languages of Mexico
Indigenous languages of Mexico